Isla Taborcillo (sometimes described as John Wayne Island) is a small private island  off the coast of Panama, which was once owned by American film actor John Wayne. Currently owned by Austrian businessman Ralph Hübner, founder of publishing company Who is Who, the island contains a resort hotel and theme park, and is a vacation destination for tourists. A part of the island has been designated as a protected bird sanctuary; egrets, brown pelicans and hummingbirds nest here.

References

External links 
 Prensa.com

Pacific islands of Panama
Private islands of Panama
John Wayne
Uninhabited islands of Panama